Jølstravatnet or Jølstravatn is a lake in Sunnfjord Municipality in Vestland county, Norway. The impressive eastern arm of Jølstravatn is called Kjøsnesfjorden, although it is not a true fjord that is part of the sea. The villages of Skei, Helgheim, Ålhus, and Vassenden are located on the shores of the lake.

Jølstravatn is a very good fishing lake.

The European route E39 highway runs along the entire northern shore of the lake.  The Norwegian National Road 5 runs along the eastern shore of the lake.  The Norwegian County Road 451 runs along the entire southern shore of the lake.  There is one bridge that crosses over the lake; on the eastern part of the lake.  The bridge is part of County Road 451 and it crosses over the Kjøsnesfjorden arm from the village of Sandvika to Kjøsnes.

Media gallery

See also
 List of lakes in Norway

References

Lakes of Vestland
Sunnfjord